The men's 4×200 metre freestyle relay event at the 1972 Olympic Games took place August 31. The relay featured teams of four swimmers each swimming four lengths of the 50 m pool freestyle.

Medalists

Results

Heats

Heat 1

Heat 2

Final

References

Swimming at the 1972 Summer Olympics
4 × 200 metre freestyle relay
Men's events at the 1972 Summer Olympics